The 1985 Afro-Asian Cup of Nations was the second edition of the Afro-Asian Cup of Nations, it was contested by Cameroon, winners of the 1984 African Cup of Nations, and Saudi Arabia, winners of the 1984 AFC Asian Cup. Cameroon won on aggregate over the two legs.
This edition were helds after the 1978 edition between Ghana and Iran which was normally the first edition one, however it was cancelled after the 1st leg.

Qualified teams

Match details

First leg

Second leg

Winners
Cameroon won 5–3 on aggregate.

References

External links
1985 Afro-Asian Cup of Nations - rsssf.com
1985 Afro-Asian Cup of Nations - goalzz.com

Afro-Asian Cup of Nations
Mer
Mer
1985 in Cameroonian football
1985–86 in Saudi Arabian football
Cameroon national football team matches
Saudi Arabia national football team matches
International association football competitions hosted by Cameroon
International association football competitions hosted by Saudi Arabia
September 1985 sports events in Africa
October 1985 sports events in Asia